In enzymology, an alpha-L-fucosidase is an enzyme that catalyzes the chemical reaction

an alpha-L-fucoside + H2O  L-fucose + an alcohol

Thus, the two substrates of this enzyme are alpha-L-fucoside and H2O, whereas its two products are L-fucose and alcohol.

This enzyme belongs to the family of hydrolases, specifically those glycosidases that hydrolyse O- and S-glycosyl compounds.  The systematic name of this enzyme class is alpha-L-fucoside fucohydrolase. This enzyme is also called alpha-fucosidase.  This enzyme participates in n-glycan degradation and glycan structures - degradation.

Deficiency of this enzyme is called Fucosidosis.

In CAZy, alpha-L-fucosidases are found in glycoside hydrolase family 29 and glycoside hydrolase family 95.

Structural studies

Human medical studies
It was in a recent study by Endreffy, Bjørklund and collaborators (2017) found an association between the activity of α-L-fucosidase-1 (FUCA-1) and chronic autoimmune disorders in children. This should encourage further research on FUCA-1 as a marker of chronic inflammation and autoimmunity.

See also 
1,2-alpha-L-fucosidase
1,3-alpha-L-fucosidase
1,6-alpha-L-fucosidase
FUCA2

References

Further reading

External links 
 CAZy family GH29
 CAZy family GH95

Protein families
EC 3.2.1
Enzymes of known structure